The Communauté urbaine Le Mans Métropole is the communauté urbaine, an intercommunal structure, centred on the city of Le Mans. It is located in the Sarthe department, in the Pays de la Loire region, northwestern France. It was created in November 1971. Its area is 267.1 km2. Its population was 205,811 in 2018, of which 143,252 in Le Mans proper.

Composition
Le Mans Métropole consists of the following 19 communes:

Aigné
Allonnes
Arnage
Champagné
La Chapelle-Saint-Aubin
Chaufour-Notre-Dame
Coulaines
Fay
Le Mans
La Milesse
Mulsanne
Pruillé-le-Chétif
Rouillon
Ruaudin
Saint-Georges-du-Bois
Saint-Saturnin
Sargé-lès-le-Mans
Trangé
Yvré-l'Évêque

References

Mans
Mans
Le Mans